Loadstar: The Legend of Tully Bodine is a video game developed by Rocket Science Games and published by BMG Interactive for the Sega CD in 1994 and MS-DOS compatible operating systems in 1995.

Plot 
The main character, Tully Bodine, has agreed to convoy contraband camels for big cash. However, he has to steer clear of the police in the process.

Gameplay 
Designed by Brian Moriarty and based on a Ron Cobb script, Loadstar is an interactive movie. Ninety minutes of video footage appear during the game. The player must steer clear of accidents and the police, and shoot down enemies and creatures, like in Sewer Shark. The goal is to get the camels to their destination, deflecting attacks with the shield along the way.

Development
Entrepreneur Elon Musk, at the time an employee of Rocket Science Games, worked as a programmer on Loadstar. He is credited as part of the "Ground Control" team.

Release
A 3DO Interactive Multiplayer version of Loadstar: The Legend of Tully Bodine was announced to be in development during E3 1995 and slated to be published by BMG Interactive. However, this version was never released for unknown reasons.

Reception 
In 1997, Jeff Sengstack of NewMedia wrote that Loadstar "bombed miserably." Its sales by that point were below 20,000 units. According to PC Data, which tracked computer game sales in the United States, Loadstar and Cadillacs and Dinosaurs: The Second Cataclysm sold under 8,000 copies combined by 1996.

Reviewing the Sega CD version, Mike Weigand of Electronic Gaming Monthly said that Loadstar "will bring back memories of Sewer Shark. The graphics are very well done, and seeing Ned Beatty in the full-motion scenes was a surprise. A decent shooter." The magazine's five reviewers scored the game an average of 7 out of 10. GamePros Captain Squideo said the production values of the full motion video are extraordinary, but tainted by the typically grainy video quality of the Sega CD, and that the game needed a port to the 3DO Interactive Multiplayer or 32X (systems with much higher full motion video capabilities than the Sega CD). He also complimented the voices and the "low key" musical score, but found the game controls poorly, with the track switching being inadequately responsive and the cursor often getting lost in the backgrounds. He nonetheless concluded that the game's production values make it above average, and deemed it "fast, fun, and addictive".

Coming Soon Magazine said this about the DOS version: "If Rebel Assault is among your favorite games, then why don't you try Rocket Science Games' first PC title, "Loadstar: The Legend of Tully Bodine?" and gave the game a 71.

Next Generation reviewed the PC version of the game, rating it two stars out of five, and stated that "all the company managed to do is to prove just how little $3 million worth of Ned Beatty on digitized footage adds to a game. For all the bells and whistles, Loadstar is just three stages of shooter set on train tracks."

References 

1994 video games
Cancelled 3DO Interactive Multiplayer games
DOS games
Interactive movie video games
Science fiction video games
Sega CD games
Single-player video games
Railroad games
Video games developed in the United States
BMG Interactive games
Rocket Science Games games